The Communauté de communes interrégionale Aumale - Blangy-sur-Bresle is a communauté de communes in the Seine-Maritime and Somme départements and in the Normandy and Hauts-de-France régions of France. It was formed on 1 January 2017 by the merger of the former Communauté de communes du Canton d'Aumale and the Communauté de communes de Blangy-sur-Bresle. It consists of 44 communes (of which 10 in Somme), and its seat is in Blangy-sur-Bresle. Its area is 464.3 km2, and its population was 21,417 in 2019.

Composition
The communauté de communes consists of the following 44 communes:

Aubéguimont
Aubermesnil-aux-Érables
Aumale
Bazinval
Biencourt
Blangy-sur-Bresle
Bouillancourt-en-Séry
Bouttencourt
Campneuseville
Le Caule-Sainte-Beuve
Conteville
Criquiers
Dancourt
Ellecourt
Fallencourt
Foucarmont
Frettemeule
Guerville
Haudricourt
Hodeng-au-Bosc
Illois
Landes-Vieilles-et-Neuves
Maisnières
Marques
Martainneville
Monchaux-Soreng
Morienne
Nesle-Normandeuse
Nullemont
Pierrecourt
Ramburelles
Réalcamp
Rétonval
Richemont
Rieux
Ronchois
Saint-Léger-aux-Bois
Saint-Maxent
Saint-Martin-au-Bosc
Saint-Riquier-en-Rivière
Tilloy-Floriville
Vieux-Rouen-sur-Bresle
Villers-sous-Foucarmont
Vismes

References 

Aumale - Blangy-sur-Bresle
Aumale - Blangy-sur-Bresle
Aumale - Blangy-sur-Bresle